is the second album released by the Japanese band The Blue Hearts. Along with Dug Out, it is one of only two studio albums consisting of a cover actually showing members of the band.

Album history
About half of the songs on this album were originally written while the band was an amateur independent band. The new songs were produced by Masahide Sakuma (佐久間 正英 Sakuma Masahide). Other changes include Masatoshi Mashima singing main vocals for some songs, Hiroto Kōmoto playing a blues harp, and the addition of a keyboard.

The three songs that were written specifically for this album are "Tōku Made", "Hoshi o Kudasai", and "Eiyū ni Akogarete". They announced that they were going to include two other songs from their time as amateurs, "Mado o Akeyō" (窓をあけよう Open the Window) and "Hon no Sukoshi Dake" (ほんの少しだけ Just a Little Bit), but these songs were never released.

Because there were a number of songs that stepped away from the normal eight-beat rhythm, recording was a problem. When Sakuma would not allow the recordings to be finalized, Kōmoto said, "This is a Blue Hearts record, so shouldn't our own abilities be enough?" Looking back, though, the group realizes that their own recording knowledge was insufficient for this record.

Songs
The first song, "Kiss Shite Hoshii" was released as a single at the same time the album was released. "Chain Gang" was the single's B-side.

"Roku de Nashi II", which has a subtitle "Gitaa Hiki ni Heya wa Nashi" (ギター弾きに部屋は無し No room for a guitar player) describes the many refusals Mashima received when searching for an apartment.

"Romantic" is the oldest song that The Blue Hearts play, as it came from Kōmoto's time with his previous band, Za Kōtsu. "Scrap" is the next oldest song.

"Restaurant" is the band's first ska tune.

Track listing

References

The Blue Hearts albums
1987 albums